Smint is a brand of sugar-free breath mints, known for their distinctive packaging that dispenses one mint at a time, and for their Reuleaux triangle shape. The name is a portmanteau of "sugarfree" and "mint", not of "small mint" as is commonly thought.

History
Smint was first conceived by Chupa Chups in 1990 as a sugar-free product targeted at adult consumers. After four years of development, Smint was introduced to the market as a subsidiary brand, and launched in the UK a year later in 1995. In 1996 Smint started their "No Smint, no kiss" campaign, aiming to make the brand name "smint" synonymous with "kissing breath".

By 2001, Smint was the top-selling mint in its class in 90% of the markets where it was available, and in the same year Smint started a partnership with Breast Cancer Care, donating 5p to the charity for every pack of strawberry Smint sold.

In 2006, Smint and Chupa Chups were taken over by Perfetti Van Melle. In 2009, Smint launched Smint-XXL tins in the UK, which are three times larger than regular Smint dispensers.

Health benefits
In 2003, Smint started advertising that the xylitol in their product provides health benefits. Xylitol has been posited to have a plaque-reducing effect which helps to prevent dental caries, but a 2014 meta-analysis found only a weak effect. Despite the weak evidence for their benefits, xylitol-sweetened mints are still better for dental health than sugared breath mints, as sugar actively contributes to tooth decay while xylitol does not.

Smint is endorsed by Toothfriendly International, an international dental ratings' organization which certifies products as being non-erosive to teeth and non-carcinogenic.

References

External links

Breath mints
Perfetti Van Melle brands
Spanish confectionery